Youssof Tolba (born 30 January 2001) is an Egyptian archer. He competed in the men's individual event at the 2020 Summer Olympics in Tokyo, Japan.

In 2019, he won the bronze medal in the men's recurve event at the African Games held in Rabat, Morocco. He also won the gold medal in both the men's team recurve event and mixed team events.

References

External links
 

2001 births
Living people
Egyptian male archers
African Games gold medalists for Egypt
African Games bronze medalists for Egypt
African Games medalists in archery
Competitors at the 2019 African Games
Olympic archers of Egypt
Archers at the 2020 Summer Olympics
Place of birth missing (living people)
Archers at the 2018 Summer Youth Olympics
21st-century Egyptian people